The enzyme germacrene-A synthase (EC 4.2.3.23) catalyzes the chemical reaction

(2E,6E)-farnesyl diphosphate  (+)-(R)-gemacrene A + diphosphate

This enzyme belongs to the family of lyases, specifically those carbon-oxygen lyases acting on phosphates.  The systematic name of this enzyme class is (2E,6E)-farnesyl-diphosphate diphosphate-lyase [(+)-(R)-germacrene-A-forming]. Other names in common use include germacrene A synthase, (+)-germacrene A synthase, (+)-(10R)-germacrene A synthase, GAS, 2-trans,6-trans-farnesyl-diphosphate diphosphate-lyase, (germacrene-A-forming).

References

 
 
 
 
 

EC 4.2.3
Enzymes of unknown structure